The Antigua and Barbuda national basketball team represents the Antigua and Barbuda Amateur Basketball Association in international competitions.

Current roster

At the 2016 Centrobasket:

Past rosters
Roster for the 2014 CBC Championship (July 1–4, 2014)

References

 Antigua and Barbuda Info page at Fiba.com
 Antigua at the 2014 CBC Championship for Men, Fiba.com. Retrieved December 22, 2014.

External links 
 Antigua & Barbuda Amateur Basketball Association
 EuroBasket.com – Antigua Men National Team

Men's national basketball teams
Basketball
1976 establishments in Antigua and Barbuda